Bagh Tak (also Romanized as Bāgh Tak) is a village in Howmeh Rural District, in the Central District of Bam County, Kerman Province, Iran. At the time of the 2006 census, its population was 171 people, belonging to 50 families.

References 

Populated places in Bam County